West Las Vegas High School (WLVHS) is a public senior high school in Las Vegas, New Mexico and part of the West Las Vegas Schools District. Founded in 1947, it is the oldest high school in the city.

The mascot of WLVHS is the Don, and the school's colors are Green and Gold. As of 2022, enrollment at the school is 413 students.

The boundary of the school district, effectively that of the high school, includes western Las Vegas and Pueblo, Ribera, San Jose, Sena, Tecolote, and Villanueva.

Academics

Student body statistics

Athletics

WLVHS competes in the New Mexico Activities Association as a AAA school in District 2. Their district includes: Raton High School, Robertson High School, Santa Fe Indian School, Santa Fe Preparatory School and St. Michaels High School.

WLVHS has won 10 State Championships since 1978.

Notable alumni 

 Teresa Leger Fernandez, attorney and member of the US House of Representatives from New Mexico's 3rd District 
 Ray Leger, educator and former member of the New Mexico Senate

Footnotes

Educational institutions established in 1947
Public high schools in New Mexico
Schools in San Miguel County, New Mexico
1947 establishments in New Mexico
Las Vegas, New Mexico
West Las Vegas